The 2010 Turkish Super Cup match were played between the Turkish Super League winner Bursaspor and the Turkish Cup winner Trabzonspor. Like the previous year the final was played at the Atatürk Olympic Stadium in Istanbul.Trabzonspor won the game 3–0 after a Hat-trick from Teófilo Gutiérrez.

Match details

References

2010
Turkish Super Cup
Super Cup 2010
Super Cup 2010